Green Dolphin Beat is a 1994 American TV movie directed by Tommy Lee Wallace. It was shot in Vancouver.

Cast
John Wesley Shipp as Terry Lattner
Jeffrey D. Sams as John King
Linda Hoffman as Ty Martin
Miguel Sandoval as Captain Juan Garcia
Troy Evans as Joe Keller
John Lavachielli as Ron Marchek
Linden Ashby as Dave Henderson
Melanie Smith as Linda Rodriguez
Kimberly Scott as Carter
Cali Timmins as Bennett

References

Review at Variety

External links
Green Dolphin Street at IMDb
Green Dolphin Beat at BFI
Green Dolphin Street at TCMDB

1994 television films
1994 films
American television films
Films shot in Vancouver
Films directed by Tommy Lee Wallace